Diogenes of Tarsus (fl. 2nd century BC) was an Epicurean philosopher, who is described by Strabo as a person clever in composing improvised tragedies. He was the author of several works, which, however, are lost. Among them are: 
Select lectures, which was probably a collection of essays and dissertations.
Epitome of Epicurus’ ethical doctrines, of which Diogenes Laërtius quotes the 12th book. 
On poetical problems, poetical problems which he endeavoured to solve, and which seem to have had special reference to the Homeric poems.

Notes

2nd-century BC Greek people
2nd-century BC philosophers
Epicurean philosophers
Hellenistic-era philosophers from Anatolia
People from Tarsus, Mersin